Carlo Falcone (born 10 March 1954) is an Antigua and Barbuda sailor. He competed in the Star event at the 1992 Summer Olympics.

References

External links
 

1954 births
Living people
Antigua and Barbuda male sailors (sport)
Antigua and Barbuda people of Italian descent
Olympic sailors of Antigua and Barbuda
Sailors at the 1992 Summer Olympics – Star
Sportspeople from Livorno